Angola Commercial Historic District is a national historic district located at Angola, Steuben County, Indiana.  The district encompasses 49 contributing buildings, 1 contributing site, and 2 contributing objects in the central business district of Shelbyville. It developed between about 1861 and the 1960, and includes notable examples of Italianate, Romanesque Revival, Beaux-Arts, Classical Revival, Late Gothic Revival, and Art Deco style architecture. Located in the district are the separately listed Steuben County Courthouse and Steuben County Jail.  Other notable buildings include the Angola City Hall, Angola Police and Fire Department Building (1939), First Congregational United Church of Christ (1899), United Methodist Church of Angola (1889), Patterson Block (1861), Jackson Block (1870), Croxton Opera House (1892), Angola Masonic Building (1929), Armory Building (1916), and First National Bank (1923).

It was listed on the National Register of Historic Places in 2010.

References

Historic districts on the National Register of Historic Places in Indiana
Italianate architecture in Indiana
Romanesque Revival architecture in Indiana
Beaux-Arts architecture in Indiana
Neoclassical architecture in Indiana
Gothic Revival architecture in Indiana
Art Deco architecture in Indiana
Buildings and structures in Steuben County, Indiana
National Register of Historic Places in Steuben County, Indiana